Echo Lake is a  water body located near North Conway in Carroll County, New Hampshire, United States. It is part of Echo Lake State Park, which features a small swimming beach.

The lake lies at the foot of White Horse Ledge and just south of Cathedral Ledge, both of which are noted rock climbing destinations in the White Mountains of New Hampshire. The lake is part of the Saco River watershed.

The lake is classified as a warmwater fishery, with observed species including smallmouth bass and yellow perch.

See also

List of lakes in New Hampshire

References

Lakes of Carroll County, New Hampshire
North Conway, New Hampshire